Swaziland competed at the 1996 Summer Olympics in Atlanta, United States.

Athletics

Men
Track and road events

Field events

Boxing

Men

Swimming

Women

References
Official Olympic Reports

Nations at the 1996 Summer Olympics
1996
Oly